Dayo Domingos António (born 20 August 1995), or simply known as Dayo, is a Mozambican footballer who plays as a striker for Ferroviário da Beira in the Moçambola.

International career

International goals
Scores and results list Mozambique's goal tally first.

References

Living people
1988 births
Mozambican footballers
Mozambique international footballers
Association football forwards
Clube Ferroviário da Beira players
AS Vita Club players
Moçambola players
Mozambican expatriate footballers
Mozambican expatriate sportspeople in the Democratic Republic of the Congo
Expatriate footballers in the Democratic Republic of the Congo